= Şahqaya =

Sahqaya
- Location within Azerbaijan
- Coordinates: 40°17′56″N 49°27′37″E
- Country: Azerbaijan
- Rayon: Baku
- Time zone: UTC+4 (AZT)
  - Summer (DST): UTC+5 (AZT)

Sahqaya (also, Shakh-Kaya) is a village in Baku, Azerbaijan.
